Alyson Wreford (born 19 February 1959) is a British luger. She competed in the women's singles event at the 1988 Winter Olympics.

References

External links
 

1959 births
Living people
British female lugers
Olympic lugers of Great Britain
Lugers at the 1988 Winter Olympics
Place of birth missing (living people)